Morten Nordstrand Nielsen (born 8 June 1983) is a Danish former professional footballer, who played as a striker. He is currently the assistant coach of F.C. Copenhagen U17. He has played eight times for the Denmark national football team.

Club career

Youth football
Born in Hundested, Nordstrand played for the local club from he was 5 to 17 years old. He was known for scoring a lot of goals, and his father thought he should move to Frederikshavn and stay at Nordjyllands Sportscollege and play for the local club Frederikshavn fI. After the college stay he moved back to Hundested.

Lyngby BK
Nordstrand's coach from college contacted Lyngby BK about Nordstrand and his talent, and afterwards he started as senior player in Lyngby. When the club went bankrupt in the winter 2001, Nordstrand moved up from the youth team as one of several amateur players comprising Lyngby BK's first team squad. He made his senior debut in December 2001, 17 years old. He played three league games, as Lyngby finished last in the 2001–02 Superliga season, and underwent forced relegation to the fourth level of Danish football, the Denmark Series.

Nordstrand stayed at the club, and proved himself a goalscorer in the lower leagues of Danish football. Lyngby won promotion to the Danish 2nd Division at the end of the 2003–04 season. Nordstrand formed a dangerous striker partnership with Christian Holst, the pair scoring 43 goals in the 2004–05 season. Nordstrand was the club topscorer with 22 goals, as Lyngby finished third in the 2nd Division that year, and won promotion to the Danish 1st Division.

Nordsjælland
When Superliga club FC Nordsjælland sold top-scoring striker, and later Danish international, Mads Junker in January 2006, it was initially speculated that Nordstrand would fill his place in the squad. Nordstrand finished the season with Lyngby, and topped the 1st Division goalscorer list with 29 goals, when Lyngby barely missed promotion during the 2005–06 season. Nordstrand decided he wanted top-flight football, and was chased by a number of Superliga clubs, as well as Dutch club FC Groningen. With his Lyngby contract running out in July 2006, he eventually signed a contract with FC Nordsjælland.

In his first season back in the top-flight Danish Superliga, he was the top goalscorer after the first half of the 2006–07 Superliga, with 10 goals in 18 games. Nordstrand was called up for the league national team, which played a number of unofficial national team games in the United States, El Salvador and Honduras in January 2007, by national team manager Morten Olsen. He played in all three games and scored one goal on the tour. On the date of arrival in Copenhagen from the tour, he was selected to the Danish national team for a friendly match against Australia in February 2007. He made his national team debut, when he came on as a substitute in the 86th minute of the match. He has played all matches of this season (33) scoring 18 or 19 goals. Some media says that he has scored 18 goals others say 19, a goal against FCM was scored by either Nordstrand or Lundberg. Which is still discussed.

F.C. Copenhagen
On 6 July 2007, Nordstrand moved to F.C. Copenhagen, signing a five-year-long contract with the Danish champions. The transfer fee was reported to be around 15 million Danish kroner (€2 million ), at that time the largest transfer fee ever paid for a player between two Danish clubs.

At F.C. Copenhagen Nordstrand quickly became an important player. In the 2007–08 season he scored 9 goals and alongside Marcus Allbäck was the team's main attacking force. In the beginning of 2008–09 season he usually started the matches, but he often found himself on the bench with Ailton Almeida and Cesar Santin playing in attack. Despite that, he scored 20 goals in competitive matches for F.C. Copenhagen in the 2008–09 season and was the team's top scorer.

He is also known as Denmark's version of Ole Gunnar Solskjær because of an old nickname "Babyface Assassin".

Loan to FC Groningen
In August 2009 Nordstrand signed for Dutch Eredivisie club FC Groningen on loan, as a replacement for fan favourite and fellow Scandinavian Marcus Berg. In his debut game with his new club, he provided the only goal in a derby against SC Heerenveen, ended in a 1–0 win for FC Groningen, the first in the Eredivisie season for the Green-Whites. On 23 March 2010, Groningen announced they would not consider the purchase option and that Nordstrand would return to F.C. Copenhagen.

Return to Nordsjælland
On 17 January 2012, Nordstrand signed a contract with FC Nordsjælland effective 1 July same year.

AGF
On 14 December 2014 Nordstrand signed 1-year contract with AGF. He left the club on 1 January 2016.

Newcastle Jets
On 28 January 2016, Nordstrand joined Australian club Newcastle Jets.

Following a positive performance including 4 goals in 11 appearances, Nordstrand signed a year extension of his contract. Then, he went on a goal drought for 13 rounds after scoring the winning goal against Brisbane Roar. Newcastle Jets did not score a goal since round 22 after his teammate Andrew Nabbout went on a goal drought as well. After he had left the club, in the first round of the next season, his replacement Roy O'Donovan scored a hat-trick against his former team.

Fremad Amager
On 3 June 2017, Nordstrand signed with Danish 1st Division-side Fremad Amager.

Coaching career
After retiring in the summer 2018, he was appointed assistant coach for the U17 team of FC Copenhagen. Two years later, in the summer 2020, he was moved to a new role as a forward coach for the U13 to the U17 teams.

International goals
Scores and results list Denmark's goal tally first, score column indicates score after each Nordstrand goal.

Honours
Danish Superliga: 2008–09
Danish Cup: 2008–09, 2011–12
Danish Superliga topscorer : 2008–09

References

External links
Danish national team profile
Career statistics at Danmarks Radio
Voetbal International profile 

1983 births
Living people
Danish men's footballers
Association football forwards
Lyngby Boldklub players
FC Nordsjælland players
F.C. Copenhagen players
FC Groningen players
Aarhus Gymnastikforening players
Newcastle Jets FC players
Danish Superliga players
Eredivisie players
A-League Men players
Denmark international footballers
Danish expatriate men's footballers
Expatriate footballers in the Netherlands
Danish expatriate sportspeople in the Netherlands
People from Hundested
Fremad Amager players
Danish 1st Division players
Danish expatriate sportspeople in Australia
Expatriate soccer players in Australia
Frederikshavn fI players
Sportspeople from the Capital Region of Denmark